David Staniforth may refer to:

 David Staniforth (field hockey) (born 1976), South African hockey player
 David Staniforth (footballer) (born 1950), English footballer